"The Schizoid Man" could refer to:
 Schizoid personality disorder
 The Schizoid Man (The Prisoner), an episode of The Prisoner
 The Schizoid Man (Star Trek: The Next Generation), an episode of Star Trek: The Next Generation (which was named after the Prisoner episode).
 Schizoid Man (comics), a character from Marvel Comics
 21st Century Schizoid Man, a song by King Crimson